Araeosoma splendens is a species of sea urchin of the family Echinothuriidae. Their armour is covered with spines. It is placed in the genus Araeosoma and lives in the sea. Araeosoma splendens was first scientifically described in 1934 by Ole Theodor Jensen Mortensen.

See also 
 Araeosoma parviungulatum
 Araeosoma paucispinum
 Araeosoma tessellatum

References 

splendens
Animals described in 1934
Taxa named by Ole Theodor Jensen Mortensen